Bitter is the third album by Meshell Ndegeocello. It was released on August 24, 1999, on Maverick Records. The album peaked at #105 on the Billboard Top 200 in 1999. The album also peaked at #13 on Billboard's Top Internet Albums chart and #40 on Billboard's R&B Albums chart.

Critical reception
Billboard called the album "a modern masterpiece," writing that it "shines for its sonic presence as well as its inherent musical quality." The New York Times wrote that "its rhythms flow in circulatory patterns guided by Ms. Ndegeocello's bass playing; guitars, strings and her guarded vocals intertwine like brain waves." The Chicago Tribune called it "one long bittersweet downer." Vibe called Bitter the "Album of the Year." The Hartford Courant wrote that "though Bitter attempts to explore ambitious life themes about loyalty, faith, love and beauty, it instead commits the mortal sin of dullness."

Track listing
"Adam" (Meshell Ndegéocello) – 2:24
"Fool of Me" (Ndegéocello, Federico González Peña) – 3:30
"Faithful" (Ndegéocello, David Gamson) – 4:46
"Satisfy" (Ndegéocello, Peña) – 4:05
"Bitter" (Ndegéocello) – 4:15
"May This Be Love" (Jimi Hendrix) – 5:17
"Sincerity" (Ndegéocello, Doyle Bramhall II) – 5:30
"Loyalty" (Ndegéocello, Allen Cato) – 4:20
"Beautiful" (Ndegéocello) – 2:44
"Eve" (David Torn, Roger Moutenot) – 1:23
"Wasted Time" (Ndegéocello) – 4:55
"Grace" (Ndegéocello) – 4:27

Personnel

Musicians
(instruments are not stated in the booklet)
Meshell Ndegéocello - vocals, electric bass, additional instruments
Lisa Coleman - piano, keyboards
Wendy Melvoin - guitar
Chris Bruce - (guitar, bass?)
Doyle Bramhall II - guitar
Ronny Drayton - electric guitar
Greg Leisz - pedal steel guitar (11 at least)
David Torn - guitar
Abraham Laboriel Jr. - drums, percussion
Daniel Sadownick - percussion
Biti Straug - background vocals
Arif St. Michael - background vocals
Joe Henry - vocals (11), (keyboards?)
Sandra Park - violin
Sharon Yamada - violin
Robert Rinehart - viola
Alan Stepansky - cello
Steve Barber – string arrangements

Technical
Craig Street – producer
Dusty Wakeman – engineer (Mad Dog Studios, Burbank, Ca.)
S. Husky Höskulds - engineer for additional recordings (Sunset Sound Factory, Los Angeles, Ca.)
Tom Schick – engineer for additional recordings (Sear Sound, New York, N.Y.) 
Elijah Bradford, Rafael Serrano, Chris Ribando, Joseph Turner – second engineers
Roger Moutenot – mixing  (Sunset Sound Factory, L.A.)
Joseph Turner – mixing assistant
Greg Calbi – mastering (Sterling Sound, N.Y.)
Paul Thompson – production assistant
Kai Morrison – project coordination
Kevin Reagan – art direction, design
Gail Swanlund – design
Sheryl Nields – photography

References

Meshell Ndegeocello albums
1999 albums
Albums produced by Craig Street
Maverick Records albums